Miss South Africa 2021 was the 63rd edition of the Miss South Africa pageant. It was held on  16 October 2021 at the Grand West Arena, Cape Town. Shudufhadzo Musida crowned Lalela Mswane as her successor at the end of the event. She went on to represent South Africa at Miss Universe 2021 and Miss Supranational 2022. She finished as second-runner up at Miss Universe 2021 and later crowned as Miss Supranational 2022.

Results
Color keys

Delegates 
The official Top 10 finalists were announced on 3 August 2021.

Top 30
The Top 30 was announced on 6 July 2021. The following 20 delegates did not advance to the top ten.

Judges

Semifinals
The following four judges determined the 30 semifinalists.
 Melinda Bam – Miss South Africa 2011
 Tamaryn Green – Miss South Africa 2018
 Liesl Laurie – Miss South Africa 2015
 Bokang Montjane-Tshabalala – Miss South Africa 2010

Finals
 Shannon Esra – Actress
 Tamaryn Green – Miss South Africa 2018
 Basetsana Kumalo – Miss South Africa 1994
 Andrea Meza – Miss Universe 2020 from Mexico
 Mamokgethi Phakeng – Vice-Chancellor of the University of Cape Town
 Dineo Ranaka – Television and radio personality
 Pia Wurtzbach – Miss Universe 2015 from the Philippines

References

2021
2021 beauty pageants
2021 in South Africa
October 2021 events in South Africa